Malaysia has competed at every iteration of the Asian Para Games which was first held in Guangzhou, China.

Asian Para Games

Medals by Games

Medals by sports

Asian Youth Para Games

Medals by Games

*Red border color indicates tournament was held on home soil.

Medals by sports
 (2013)
 (2017)  (2021)

See also 
 Malaysia at the Paralympics
 Malaysia at the Deaflympics
 Malaysia at the Asian Games

References 

 
Asian Para Games
Nations at the Asian Para Games